Shelby County is a county in the U.S. state of Indiana. As of the 2010 United States Census, the population was 44,436. The county seat (and only incorporated city) is Shelbyville.

History
After the American Revolutionary War established US sovereignty over the territory of the upper midwest, the new federal government defined the Northwest Territory in 1787, which included the area of present-day Indiana. In 1800, Congress separated Ohio from the Northwest Territory, designating the rest of the land as the Indiana Territory. President Thomas Jefferson chose William Henry Harrison as the governor of the territory, and Vincennes was established as the capital. After the Michigan Territory was separated and the Illinois Territory was formed, Indiana was reduced to its current size and geography. By December 1816 the Indiana Territory was admitted to the Union as a state.

The Native people who inhabited these areas prior to arrival of European settlers were generally resistant to the loss of their lands. As settlers pushed into the area, treaties signed by some leaders with United States representatives ceded large areas of their territory to the US. Starting in 1794, Native American titles to Indiana lands were extinguished by usurpation, purchase, or war and treaty. The United States acquired land from the Native Americans in the 1809 treaty of Fort Wayne, and by the treaty of St. Mary's in 1818, which included the future Shelby County.

The Indiana State Legislature passed a bill on 31 December 1821 that authorized the creation of four counties, including Shelby. On 1 July 1822 the county was organized, beginning with selecting a site for the county seat.

The new county was named for Gen. Isaac Shelby, who defeated the British at the Battle of Kings Mountain in the Revolutionary War. Shelby then became the first Governor of Kentucky. During the War of 1812, he led the army of Kentucky into Canada, and defeated the British at the decisive Battle of the Thames in 1813.

Geography
The low, rolling hills of Shelby County are lightly carved by drainages, but are otherwise completely devoted to agriculture or urban development. The western edge of the county is drained by Sugar Creek, flowing south-southwestward into Johnson County. The central and SW parts of the county are drained by Big Blue River, flowing south-southwestward into Johnson County. The lower part of the county is drained by Flatrock River, flowing southwestward into Bartholomew County. The terrain slopes to the southwest, with its highest elevations ( ASL) along the eastern part of its northern border with Hancock County.

City and towns

 Edinburgh (part)
 Fairland
 Morristown
 St. Paul (part)
 Shelbyville (city/county seat)

Unincorporated communities

 Beech Brook
 Bengal
 Blue Ridge
 Boggstown
 Brookfield
 Candleglo Village
 Clover Village
 Fenns
 Flat Rock
 Fountaintown
 Freeport
 Geneva
 Green Meadows
 Gwynneville
 Knighthood Grove
 Knighthood Village
 Lewis Creek
 London
 London Heights
 Marietta
 Marion
 Meiks
 Meltzer
 Middletown
 Morven
 Mount Auburn
 Norristown
 Pleasant View
 Pleasure Valley
 Prescott
 Rays Crossing
 Rolling Ridge
 Sleepy Hollow
 Smithland
 Sugar Creek
 Waldron (census-designated place)
 Walkerville
 Wilson Corner

Townships

 Addison
 Brandywine
 Hanover
 Hendricks
 Jackson
 Liberty
 Marion
 Moral
 Noble
 Shelby
 Sugar Creek
 Union
 Van Buren
 Washington

Adjacent counties

 Hancock County - north
 Rush County - east
 Decatur County - southeast
 Bartholomew County - south
 Johnson County - west
 Marion County - northwest

Major highways

  Interstate 65
  Interstate 74
  U.S. Route 52
  U.S. Route 421
  Indiana State Road 9
  Indiana State Road 44
  Indiana State Road 244
  Indiana State Road 252

Climate and weather

2010 Census
As of the 2010 United States Census, there were 44,436 people, 17,302 households, and 12,221 families in the county. The racial makeup of the county was 95.4% white, 1.0% black or African American, 0.5% Asian, 0.2% American Indian, 1.6% from other races, and 1.2% from two or more races. Those of Hispanic or Latino origin made up 3.7% of the population. In terms of ancestry, 28.5% were German, 13.1% were American, 12.2% were Irish, and 9.0% were English.

Of the 17,302 households, 33.8% had children under the age of 18 living with them, 54.4% were married couples living together, 10.5% had a female householder with no husband present, 29.4% were non-families, and 24.5% of all households were made up of individuals. The average household size was 2.53 and the average family size was 2.98. The median age was 39.9 years.

The median income for a household in the county was $47,697 and the median income for a family was $60,824. Males had a median income of $46,325 versus $32,416 for females. The per capita income for the county was $26,398. About 7.4% of families and 10.0% of the population were below the poverty line, including 13.7% of those under age 18 and 10.5% of those age 65 or over.

Government

The county government is a constitutional body, and is granted specific powers by the Constitution of Indiana, and by the Indiana Code.

County Council: The legislative branch of the county government; controls spending and revenue collection in the county. Representatives are elected to four-year terms from county districts. They set salaries, the annual budget, and special spending. The council has limited authority to impose local taxes, in the form of an income and property tax that is subject to state level approval, excise taxes, and service taxes.

Board of Commissioners: The executive body of the county; commissioners are elected county-wide to staggered four-year terms. One commissioner serves as president. The commissioners execute the acts legislated by the council, collect revenue, and manage the county government.

Court: Three State Trial Courts sit in the Courthouse located at 407 S. Harrison Street, Shelbyville, Indiana 46176. Shelby Circuit Court was established by the Indiana Constitution. Shelby Superior Courts 1 and 2 were created by Acts of the Legislature. Shelby Superior Court 2 handles the small claims. Cases are allocated between the Courts by Local Court Rules. The judges of the Shelby Cirucit and Superior Courts are elected to six (6) year terms and must be admitted to practice law in the State of Indiana. Appeals from Shelby County Trial Courts are made to the Indiana Court of Appeals.

County Officials: The county has other elected offices, including sheriff, coroner, auditor, treasurer, recorder, surveyor, and circuit court clerk. These officials are elected to four-year terms. Members elected to county government positions are required to declare party affiliations and to be residents of the county.

Political culture

Demographics

Notable people
 Isaac Colton Ash, Los Angeles, California, City Council member, 1925–27
 George W. Clarke, governor of Iowa, 1913–1917
 Edith Jones Woodward, astronomer, born in Waldron in 1914
 Kid Quill, hip hop/rap

See also
 National Register of Historic Places listings in Shelby County, Indiana

References

 

 
Indiana counties
1821 establishments in Indiana
Populated places established in 1821
Indianapolis metropolitan area